Bucculatrix caspica is a moth in the family Bucculatricidae. It was described by R. Puplesis and V. Sruoga in 1991. It is found in Kazakhstan, Uzbekistan, Tadjikistan
and the southern part of European Russia. It is most likely a synonym of Bucculatrix ulmifoliae.

The length of the forewings is 2.9-3-1 mm for males and 3.3 mm for females. The forewings are creamy white with some brown spots. The hindwings are greyish cream to pale brownish.

The larvae feed on Ulmus species. They mine the leaves of their host plant. The mine has the form of a long, narrow gallery with black linear frass. Pupation takes place in a whitish cream cocoon.

References

Natural History Museum Lepidoptera generic names catalog

Bucculatricidae
Moths described in 1991
Moths of Asia
Moths of Europe